Aldo Bet (born 26 March 1949) is a retired Italian professional footballer who played as a defender. An old-fashioned stopper, he was a sturdy and physically imposing defender, who was known for his tenacious man marking of opposing players.

Career
An Inter youth product, Bet was later promoted to the senior squad, before manager Helenio Herrera brought him to Roma, where he made his breakthrough, winning a Coppa Italia, and also earning a call-up to play for the Italy national football team. After five seasons with Roma, and one with Verona, he joined A.C. Milan in the summer of 1974. He was usually paired alongside a sweeper in the team's defence: first Maurizio Turone, and later a young Franco Baresi; he won a second Coppa Italia with Milan, and was a member of the team that won club's tenth league title in 1979.

Honours

Club
Roma
 Coppa Italia winner: 1968–69.

Milan
 Serie A champion: 1978–79.
 Coppa Italia winner: 1976–77.

Individual
 A.C. Milan Hall of Fame

External links
 Profile at magliarossonera.it

References

1949 births
Living people
Italian footballers
Italy international footballers
Italy under-21 international footballers
Serie A players
Serie B players
Inter Milan players
A.S. Roma players
Hellas Verona F.C. players
A.C. Milan players
Association football defenders